The following are the national records in athletics in El Salvador maintained by El Salvador's national athletics federation: Federación Salvadoreña de Atletismo (FSA).

Outdoor

Key to tables:

A = affected by altitude

Men

Women

Indoor

Men

Women

References
General
Salvadorian Records 31 December 2021 updated
Specific

External links
FSA website

El Salvador
Athletics
Records
Athletics